Head over Heels is the third studio album released by American singer Paula Abdul on June 13, 1995 under Virgin Records. The album features three singles "My Love Is for Real", "Crazy Cool" and "Ain't Never Gonna Give You Up".

Background
In 1994, Abdul took a break on her music career to focus on her personal life. Her marriage to Emilio Estevez ended with them filing for divorce, and she sought treatment for bulimia. "I was so sad, I just needed to be filled up. It was like I was trying to fill this big empty hole", she said. This experience gave her strength to work on a third album, Head over Heels, her most honest and personal project. "I took all the stuff I was afraid to face, and put it in my music", the singer said. Abdul also stated that, "It's a completely different space and time for me. I've experienced some spiritual growth that has allowed me to really get back to what I enjoy doing best. And that's being totally connected to the creative source as a recording artist and dancer".

For Head over Heels, Abdul decided to work with an array of different producers. According to her: "I've now experienced both sides. On my first album, I worked with seven producers; on 'Spellbound' I worked with only a few. Going into my third album, I wanted to again experiment with many different people and flavors". At the same time, "I went into this album thinking I didn't want to be in any compromising situations, as I was at times, on my last two albums. Going into the studio and creating an album is a very intimate experience. I'm now more involved in the production end of my songs. I'm unafraid to state what my feelings and opinions are. All my producers were so open to my input and they were very honest. They said, 'Thank God you thought of that'. It was a good feeling."

Composition
Head over Heels is primarily a pop, R&B, and funk album with elements of motown soul, lite rap, latin pop, psychedelic soul, soul-pop, and Middle Eastern music.

Commercial performance
Head over Heels did not do as well as Abdul's previous albums, peaking on the US Billboard 200 chart at number 18. The album is currently certified gold.

Three singles were released from Head over Heels. The first single, "My Love Is for Real", was the only Top 40 single from the album, peaking at number 28 on the Billboard Hot 100. The following single, "Crazy Cool" peaked at number 58. However, both of them were more successful on the US Dance Club Songs chart, with the former topping it (her only song to do so). The last single from the album, "Ain't Never Gonna Give You Up", reached number 12 on the Bubbling Under Hot 100.

Track listing

Personnel
Adapted from AllMusic.

Paula Abdul – all vocals
Bryan Abrams, Cha'n Andre, Robb Boldt, Robbie J. Brown, Mark Calderon, Cindy & Janie Cruse, Valerie & Worthy Davis, Bruce DeShazer, Ofra Haza, Marva King, Tanya Smith, Sandra St. Victor, Kevin Thornton, Sam Watters, Monalisa Young – backing vocals
Dallas Austin – various instruments
Charlie Barnett – percussion
Rocky Bryant – keyboards, synthesizers, drums, percussion
Keith Carlock – drums, percussion
Vince Denham – tenor saxophone
Walt Fowler, Ralph Rickert, Dan Savant – trumpet
Ronnie Garrett, Tracy Wormworth – bass guitar
Grant Geissman – banjo
Lili Haydn – violin
Howard Hersh, Peter Lord Moreland, John Andrew Shreiner, V. Jeffrey Smith – keyboards
Eric Jorgenson – trombone
Shaun LaBelle – electric bass guitar, synthesizers
John Leftwich – horns
Oliver Leiber – keyboards, synthesizers, guitars, electric sitar, drums, percussion
Iki Levy – percussion
Keith Lewis – percussion and various programming
Karl Messerschmidt – tuba
Tim Miner – electric bass, keyboards, backing vocals
Michael Patterson – synthesizers
Paul Peterson – electric piano
Harihar Rao – sitar, tamboura
John Shanks, Andy Timmons, Bill Wiseman – guitars
Rick Sheppard – synthesizers, samples
Daryl Simmons – keyboards, programming, drums, percussion, backing vocals
Ralph Stacey – electric and bass guitars
Gerri Sutyak – cello
Albert Wing – tenor and alto saxophone, clarinet

Charts

Certifications

References

Paula Abdul albums
1995 albums
Albums produced by Dallas Austin
Virgin Records albums